John Sevier Fossil Plant, commonly known as John Sevier Steam Plant, was a 0.88-gigawatt (880 MW) coal-fired power plant located in Hawkins County, Tennessee, south of Rogersville on the shore of the Holston River. It was operated by the Tennessee Valley Authority.

It was decommissioned in 2012, and replaced by a combined-cycle natural gas plant in the same year. The plant and its two 350 foot tall smokestacks were demolished from 2015 to 2017.

References

Tennessee Valley Authority
Buildings and structures in Hawkins County, Tennessee
Energy infrastructure completed in 1955
Demolished buildings and structures in Tennessee